Pacificana is a genus of spiders in the family Miturgidae. It was first described in 1904 by Hogg. , it contains only one species, Pacificana cockayni, found in New Zealand.

References

Miturgidae
Monotypic Araneomorphae genera
Spiders of New Zealand